Wattakaka volubilis, synonyms including Dregea volubilis, is a species of plant in the family Apocynaceae that is native from north-east Pakistan eastwards to south China and southwards to Java.

Regional names
"Kodippaalai" in Tamil, "wattakakka" in Malayalam, "gwedauk" in Myanmar (Burmese).

Description
A stout tall climber, branches often pustular, with:
 Leaves: 3–6 inches long by 2–4 inches broad, rather coriaceous, base rounded or cordate ; nerves 4–6 pairs ; petiole 1–3 inches.
 Peduncles: 1–3 inches, rather slender ; umbels drooping, very many-flowered, subglobose; pedicals 1/2 inch, slender.
 Corolla: 1/2 inch diameter, cupular, lobes triangular.
 Stigma dome-shaped.
 Follicles: 3/4 inch long by 1–1 and half inch diameter, broadly lanceolate, turgid, glabrous.
 Seeds: 2 inch long, broadly ovate, pale, smooth and shining, border thick.

Distribution
Wattakaka volubilis has a very wide distribution in south China and tropical Asia. It is found throughout the Indian subcontinent (the Assam region, Bangladesh, the east and west Himalayas, the rest of India, Nepal, Pakistan and Sri Lanka); in southeast and south-central China and Taiwan; throughout Indochina (the Andaman Islands, Cambodia, Laos, Myanmar, the Nicobar Islands, Thailand and Vietnam); and in parts of Malesia (Java, Malaya and the Philippines). In India, the plant is distributed from Northwest India to Bengal, Assam and the Deccan Peninsula, and southwards from the Konkan. In Sri Lanka, it occurs in the hotter parts of the island.

References

Asclepiadoideae
Flora of South-Central China
Flora of Southeast China
Flora of Taiwan
Flora of the Indian subcontinent
Flora of Indo-China
Flora of Java
Flora of Malaya
Flora of the Philippines